Henri Dussell (3 October 1900 – 22 December 1977) was an Australian rules footballer for Essendon in the Victorian Football League (VFL).

He played his final VFL match in 1921 having played 32 matches.

References

External links
 
 

1900 births
Essendon Football Club players
Australian rules footballers from Melbourne
1977 deaths
People from Essendon, Victoria